These page lists all the matches played by the North Macedonia national football team since 2019 when the country was renamed North Macedonia according to the Prespa agreement.

For games played between 1993 and 2018, see Macedonia national football team results.

2019

Summary

Matches

2020

Summary

Matches

2021

Summary

Matches

2022

Summary

Matches

Notes

References

External links
EU-Football - international football match results of Macedonia 1993-present
RSSSF archive of results
FIFA.com - Macedonia: Fixtures and Results
World Referee - Matches featuring Macedonia

2019-